John Saul Adrian Battsek (born September 1963)  is a British film producer of documentary films. Battsek co-founded Passion Pictures, a two-time Oscar-winning and four-time Oscar nominated independent production company.

In 2020 Battsek departed Passion Pictures to launch creative studio Ventureland with producers Kerstin Emhoff, Ali Brown and director Paul Hunter.

Career and awards
Battsek is the son of Micha Battsek, a godson of Albert Einstein. He attended Highgate School until 1977. In 1999 he conceived and produced Academy Award winning One Day in September.

He served as an executive producer on Academy Award-winning Searching For Sugar Man, Academy Award nominated Restrepo & Winter On Fire and BAFTA award-winning documentaries Hillsborough and The Imposter.
   
In 2013 Battsek produced Greg Barker's Emmy Award-winning documentary Manhunt: The Search For Bin Laden. In 2016 Battsek produced Peabody Award-winning and BAFTA-nominated Listen to Me Marlon. In 2017 Battsek produced Eric Clapton: Life In 12 Bars which was nominated for a Grammy Award for Best Music Film. In 2018 Battsek produced Emmy Award-winning documentary Forever Pure.

Battsek was nominated for a PGA Award in 2010 and in 2011 for Sergio and The Tillman Story, respectively. He was also nominated in 2015 for The Green Prince. In 2013 he received the Grierson Trust Trustees' Award.

In 2019, he produced the AACTA Award-winning Australian feature-length documentary, The Australian Dream.

Filmography
One Day in September (1999) – producer
The Game of Their Lives (2002) – executive producer
Live Forever: The Rise and Fall of Brit Pop (2003) – producer
Peace One Day (2004) – co-producer
Lila Says (Lila Dit Ca) (2004) – co-producer
A State of Mind (2004) – producer
Black Sun (2005) – producer
Once in a Lifetime: The Extraordinary Story of the New York Cosmos (2006) – producer
Crossing the Line (2006) – executive producer
In the Shadow of the Moon (2007) – executive producer
My Kid Could Paint That (2007) – executive producer
In Prison My Whole Life (2007) – co-producer
Sergio (2009) – producer
The Age of Stupid (2009) – executive producer
Restrepo (2010) – executive producer
The Stones in Exile – (2010) – producer
The Tillman Story – (2010) – producer
Fire in Babylon – (2010) – producer 
Project Nim – (2011) – executive producer
Bob & the Monster – (2011) – executive producer 
Better This World – (2011) – executive producer 
Koran by Heart – (2011)  – producer 
The Imposter – (2012) – executive producer 
Searching for Sugar Man – (2012) – executive producer
How I Live Now – (2013) – producer
Hillsborough – (2014) – executive producer
Listen to Me Marlon – (2015) – producer
We Are X – (2016) – producer
Keep Quiet – (2016) – executive producer
The Fall – (2016) – executive producer
George Best – All by Himself – (2016) – producer
Forever Pure – (2016) – executive producer
Five Came Back – 2017 – producer
Legion of Brothers – 2017 – producer
The Final Year – 2017 – producer
Eric Clapton: Life in 12 Bars – 2017 – producer
Westwood: Punk, Icon, Activist – 2018 – producer
Studio 54 – 2018 – producer
If I Leave Here Tomorrow: A Film About Lynyrd Skynyrd – 2018 – producer
The Serengeti Rules – 2018 – executive producer
Mike Wallace Is Here – 2019 – producer
The Australian Dream – 2019 – producer
Andy Murray: Resurfacing – 2019 – producer
Citizen K – 2019 – producer
Circus of Books – 2019 – executive producer
Sid and Judy – 2019 – producer
Mystify: Michael Hutchence – 2019 – producer
Oliver Sacks: His Own Life – 2019 – executive producer
 Rising Phoenix – 2020 – producer
 'Til Kingdom Come – 2020 – producer
 The Deepest Breath – 2023 – producer

References

External links
 
 Interview with John Battsek
 LIVE FOREVER - Movie Q&A with John Dower and John Battsek
 John Battsek talks Oscar-winning documentary career, future projects

Living people
1963 births
British documentary film producers
People educated at Highgate School